The Jaworzno Power Station is a complex of coal-fired thermal power stations at Jaworzno, Poland.

The largest plant of the Jaworzno power plant complex is called Jaworzno III. It has an installed electrical generating capacity of 1,345 MW, as well as thermal heating capacity of 321 MWt.

History 
The beginnings of the plant go back to 1898, when the first two generators were installed with the capacity of 320 kW for the purpose of lighting the neighbouring coal mines and houses.  In 1959, after modernization the power station's capacity reached 157 MW.

Is 1940s, the construction of the Jaworzno II Power Station started and in 1953 the first two generating units became operational. In 1956, the Jaworzno Power Station II reached the capacity of 300 MW.  The two power stations were merged into a single company in 1972.

Construction of the Jaworzno III Power Station started in 1972 and the generating units were commissioned in 1976–1979.  In 1995, all three stations were combined into a state-owned company called Elektrownia Jaworzno III.  The first power station was decommissioned in 1998.  In 2000, the Elektrownia Jaworzno III became part of PKE SA.

The Jaworzno III Plant 

See also

 List of power stations in Poland
 Katowice Power Station 
 Kozienice Power Station 
 Połaniec Power Station 
 Łaziska Power Station 
 List of towers

References

External links
 
 Tauron Jaworzno III 
 

Energy infrastructure completed in 1898
Energy infrastructure completed in 1953
Energy infrastructure completed in 1972
Towers completed in 1972
Coal-fired power stations in Poland
Cogeneration power stations in Poland
Chimneys in Poland
Buildings and structures in Jaworzno